Asher Crosby Hinds (February 6, 1863 – May 1, 1919) was a United States representative from Maine. He attended the public schools and Coburn Classical Institute.

Hinds graduated from Colby College in 1883, then began newspaper work in Portland in 1884.  He was appointed as a  clerk to the Speaker of the United States House of Representatives from 1889 to 1891.  He then became clerk at the Speaker's table 1895–1911.  He was editor of the Rules, Manual, and Digest of the House of Representatives in 1899 and of Hinds’ Precedents of the House of Representatives 1908. According to a 2013 study, Hinds' Precedents successfully altered the behavior of House representatives, as they became less willing to appeal decisions of the chair. Hinds was elected as a Republican to the Sixty-second, Sixty-third, and Sixty-fourth Congresses (March 4, 1911 – March 3, 1917).

He resided in Washington, D.C., until his death on May 1, 1919. He is buried in Evergreen Cemetery in Portland, Maine.

References

1863 births
1919 deaths
Colby College alumni
People from Benton, Maine
Republican Party members of the United States House of Representatives from Maine
19th-century American politicians